Franklin Ulyses Valderrama (born 1962) is a United States district judge of the United States District Court for the Northern District of Illinois.

Education 

Valderrama earned his Bachelor of Arts from the University of Illinois at Chicago, and his Juris Doctor from the DePaul University College of Law.

Career 

Valderrama began his career at the Chicago office of Landau, Omahana & Kopka, where he was an associate for a year. He then worked at Sanchez, Daniels & Hoffman in Chicago, where his practice focused on trial litigation. He left the firm as a partner when he became a judge. He has also served as an adjunct professor at UIC John Marshall Law School, where he taught pre-trial civil litigation.

State judicial service 

From 2007 to 2020, Valderrama served as an Associate Judge of the Cook County Circuit Court. His state court service terminated when he became a federal district judge.

Federal judicial service 

On February 5, 2020, President Donald Trump announced his intent to nominate Valderrama to serve as a United States district judge of the United States District Court for the Northern District of Illinois. On February 12, 2020, his nomination was sent to the Senate. President Trump nominated Valderrama to the seat vacated by Judge Rubén Castillo, who retired on September 27, 2019. A hearing on his nomination before the Senate Judiciary Committee was held on June 24, 2020. On July 30, 2020, his nomination was reported out of committee by a 16–6 vote. On September 17, 2020, the United States Senate confirmed his nomination by a 68–26 vote. He received his judicial commission on September 23, 2020.

See also 
 List of African-American federal judges
 List of African-American jurists
 List of Hispanic/Latino American jurists

References

External links 
 

1962 births
Living people
20th-century American lawyers
21st-century American lawyers
21st-century American judges
African-American judges
African-American lawyers
DePaul University College of Law alumni
Hispanic and Latino American judges
Hispanic and Latino American lawyers
Illinois lawyers
Judges of the Circuit Court of Cook County
John Marshall Law School (Chicago) faculty
Judges of the United States District Court for the Northern District of Illinois
People from Panama City
United States district court judges appointed by Donald Trump
University of Illinois Chicago alumni